Dmitri (or Dimitri, Dmytro, Dzmitry) Lebedev may refer to:
 Dmitri Lebedev (businessman) (born 1968), CEO of Rossiya Bank
 Dmitri Lebedev (general) (1872–1935), Russian general
 Dzmitry Lebedzew (born 1986), Belarusian footballer